ORP Gryf (Wodnik class) is a Polish schoolship of the Polish Navy, the third vessel to bear that name. She is named after the notable Polish WWII minelayer. Built in Northern Shipyard in Gdańsk as a sister ship of ORP Wodnik, in 1976 she replaced the previous ORP Gryf in her role of a school ship.

Prior to the Gulf War she was refurbished in Gdynia and became a hospital ship. In that role she was sent to the Persian Gulf and took part in the conflict. Currently she serves as a base ship and harbour-locked naval school of the Polish Navy.

Auxiliary ships of Poland
Training ships of Poland
1976 ships